Župa Srednja (Serbian Cyrillic: Жупа Средња) is a village in the Split-Dalmatia County, Croatia located in the Zagvozd municipality. In 2011 it was populated by 3 inhabitants.

References 

zupa Srednja
zupa Srednja